Kateryna Bilokon (born March 12, 1998) is a Ukrainian female acrobatic gymnast. With partners Olena Karakuts and Nadiia Kotliar, Bilokon competed in the 2014 Acrobatic Gymnastics World Championships.

References

1998 births
Living people
Ukrainian acrobatic gymnasts
Female acrobatic gymnasts